Velaine-en-Haye is a former commune in the Meurthe-et-Moselle department in north-eastern France. On 1 January 2019, it was merged into the new commune Bois-de-Haye.

See also
Communes of the Meurthe-et-Moselle department

References

Velaineenhaye